Anubias gigantea is a species belonging to the Aroid genus Anubias. It was first mentioned by Auguste Chevalier in 1920, based on material that he had collected in Guinea. The formal description followed in 1939 by John Hutchinson. It is closely related to A. afzelii, basically only differing from that species by the form of the leaf-blade.

Synonyms 
The following names are synonyms of A. gigantea: A. gigantea var. tripartita Chevalier, 1920 and A. hastifolia var. robusta Engler, 1915.

Distribution 
Anubias gigantea is known from West Africa, including the countries of Guinea, Sierra Leone, Liberia, Ivory Coast, and Togo.

Description 
The leaf stems are slightly shorter till up to 2.5 times longer than the blade. The leaves are set on a creeping and rooting rhizome that is 1–3 cm thick. The upper part is covered with male flowers, of which the 4-6 stamens are fused into synandria, with the thecae on its sides. The lower part of the spadix is covered with female flowers that are reduced to the ovary and stigma.

Ecology 
The plant is semi-aquatic and grows mostly on rocky places at the banks of rivers or in the riverbed. It flowers from February to April.

Cultivation 
This plant grows best when only partially submersed and not crowded by other plants and is most suited for the paludarium, but can also be used in larger aquariums, where it grows very slowly. It does not require much light. It prefers a temperature range of 22-26 °C. It can be propagated by dividing the rhizome, but seed-propagation is not difficult either.

References 

gigantea
Aquatic plants
Flora of West Tropical Africa
Plants described in 1939